Mallosia armeniaca is a species of beetle in the family Cerambycidae, that can be found in Armenia and Turkey. The species is hairy and brown coloured. The wings are black with white dots.

References

Saperdini
Beetles described in 1898
Beetles of Asia